Auwal Yadudu (born 1953) is a Nigerian academic. He is a professor of law and the current Vice-Chancellor of the Federal University, Birnin Kebbi, Kebbi State, Nigeria.

Early life

Yadudu was born in Funtua, Katsina State. He earned his diploma in law in 1978 from Ahmadu Bello University in Zaria. He proceeded to obtain his Bachelor of Laws there in 1979. He later earned his Master of Laws (LLM) in 1982 and Doctor of Judicial Science from the Harvard Law School in the United States in 1985.

Career

He served as Dean of the Faculty of Law at Bayero University. Yadadu served as the Legal Adviser to the late Head of State, General Sani Abacha. He also served as the Deputy Chairman of the National Conference Standing Committee on Law, Judiciary and Human Rights.

References

1953 births
Living people
Academic staff of Bayero University Kano
Vice-Chancellors of Nigerian universities
Ahmadu Bello University alumni
Harvard Law School alumni